Sir Thomas Lunsford (c. 1610 – c. 1653) was a Royalist colonel in the English Civil War.

Family
Lunsford was son of Thomas Lunsford of Wilegh, Sussex. His mother, Katherine, was daughter of Thomas Fludd, treasurer of war to Queen Elizabeth, and sister of Robert Fludd the Rosicrucian. Lunsford was the third son and heir, with a twin, Herbert. His brothers Herbert and Henry were also Royalist officers. Henry was killed in July 1643 during the assault on Bristol.

Lunsford married three times. He and his first wife, Anne Hudson (d. 1638), had one son who died in infancy. In 1640, he married Katherine (d. 1649), daughter of Sir Henry Neville; with whom he had three daughters. His third wife was Elizabeth, the daughter of Henry Wormeley of Riccall, Yorkshire, and the widow of Richard Kempe, secretary of Virginia; with whom he had one daughter.

Early life
Lunsford had a wild temperament from an early age. On 27 June 1632, he was charged with killing deer on the grounds of his relative, Sir Thomas Pelham. In August 1633, Lunsford tried to murder Pelham by firing upon him from the doorway of a church. He was indicted, and sent on 16 August to Newgate Prison. He escaped in October 1634, although "so lame that he can only go in a coach", and fled to the continent. He served in the French army and was made colonel of a foot regiment. He was tried in absentia in the Star Chamber in June 1637, fined £8,000, and outlawed for failing to appear before the court.

English Civil War
In 1639, Lunsford returned to England, received a pardon from King Charles I, and joined the king's army against the Scots. During the Scottish expedition the following year, he commanded a regiment raised from the Somerset Trained Bands. His regiment fought at the Battle of Newburn on 28 August 1640, being routed after defending the crossing against Scottish cavalry and artillery. 

On 22 December 1641, the king appointed Lunsford as Lieutenant of the Tower of London. The next day, the common council of London presented a petition to the House of Commons against his appointment. Bowing to pressure, the king removed him from the post on 26 December. The following day, Lunsford was called before the Commons for examination. On leaving the house, he was engaged in a free-for-all in Westminster Hall. Roundhead propagandists painted Lunsford with a reputation for sadism, brutality, and cannibalism. This episode was seen as contributing to the king's growing unpopularity and ultimate demise.

The king knighted Lunsford on 28 December and appointed him commander of an unofficial royal guard at the Palace of Whitehall. On 4 January 1642, Sir Thomas accompanied the king on his ill-fated attempt to arrest Five Members of the House of Commons. On 13 January, he was arrested as a traitor for allegedly joining Lord Digby in a plot to capture the magazine at Kingston upon Thames. However, contemporary accounts contradict one another, leaving in doubt whether the plot was real or imagined. Regardless, Sir Thomas was released in June, and participated in several military engagements over the next few months. Captured at the Battle of Edgehill in October 1642, he was charged with treason and imprisoned in Warwick Castle, from which he was released in May 1644.

Denouement
Sir Thomas was captured again at the Siege of Hereford in December 1645. He remained a prisoner until 1648. On 7 August 1649, he was granted permission to emigrate to Virginia with his wife and family, where he became a lieutenant-general of the Virginia militia. Accounts place his death either c. 1653 or c. 1656.

References

Attribution

External links

1610s births
1650s deaths
Cavaliers
Lieutenants of the Tower of London
Somerset Militia officers
Recipients of English royal pardons